Thielman is a German surname. Notable people with the name include:
 Jake Thielman (John Peter Thielman, 1879–1928), German-American baseball pitcher
 Henry Thielman (1880–1942), brother of the above, baseball pitcher
 Vale P. Thielman (1843–1925) American politician from South Dakota

See also 
 Thielmann
 Thielemann
 Thiemann

German-language surnames